Albert James Moore (August 4, 1902 – November 29, 1974) was an outfielder in Major League Baseball. He played for the New York Giants.

References

External links

1902 births
1974 deaths
Major League Baseball outfielders
New York Giants (NL) players
Baseball players from New York (state)
Sportspeople from Brooklyn
Baseball players from New York City
Montpelier Goldfish players